Breaker  may refer to:

Objects
 A breaking wave on water, or a "breaker", a shallow over which waves break
 Circuit breaker, an electrical overload switch
 Breaker (hydraulic), a percussion hammer attached to an excavator

People
 Breaker Morant (1864-1902), Anglo-Australian folk hero, horseman, poet, soldier and convicted war criminal nicknamed "The Breaker"
 Daniel Breaker (born 1980), American actor and comedian
 Ronald Breaker, American biochemist and Yale professor
 Someone who performs B-boying, also known as breakdancing

Places
 Breaker Mountain, Canada
 Mount Breaker, Graham Land, Antarctica
 Breaker Island, Palmer Archipelago, Antarctica
 Breaker Reef, Hong Kong, an uninhabited island

Arts and entertainment
 The Breaker (film), a 1974 documentary about Breaker Morant
 Breaker (Accept album), 1981
 Breaker (For Today album), 2010
 Breaker (Vary Lumar album), 2014
 The Breaker (album), by Little Big Town, 2017
 The Breaker (manhwa), a Korean comic
 Breaker (Black), an outdoor sculpture
 Breaker (G.I. Joe), a fictional character
 The Breaker, a book by Minette Walters

Other uses
 , several US Navy ships
 Ship breaker, a firm that engages in ship breaking, i.e. scrapping ships
 A brand of lager brewed in the UK by Coors
 Breaker fruit or breaker stage in the ripening of fruit

See also 

Breaker! Breaker!, a 1977 action film starring Chuck Norris
"Breaker-Breaker", a 1976 song by the American Southern rock band Outlaws
Breakers (disambiguation)
Breaking (disambiguation)

es:Interruptor